
t Vlasbloemeken is a restaurant located in Koewacht, Netherlands. It is a fine dining restaurant that is awarded a Michelin star for the period 2012-present.

In 2014, GaultMillau awarded the restaurant 15 out of 20 points. 

Head chef of t Vlasbloemeken is Eric van Bochoven.

See also
List of Michelin starred restaurants in the Netherlands

References 

Restaurants in the Netherlands
Michelin Guide starred restaurants in the Netherlands
Restaurants in Zeeland
Terneuzen